Pennzoil Place is a set of two 36-story towers in Downtown Houston, United States. designed by Philip Johnson/John Burgee Architects from a concept by Eli Attia, a staff architect with the firm.  Completed in 1976, it is Houston's most award-winning skyscraper and is widely known for its innovative design.

History
In May 1976 Deutsche Bank and other partners in a West German investment group bought a 90 percent interest in the Pennzoil Place building for $100 million.

Development and style
Pennzoil Place, developed and managed by Gerald D. Hines Interests, consists of two  trapezoidal towers placed ten feet apart and sheathed in dark bronze glass and aluminum. The buildings are mirror images of each other. The entire street-level plaza joining the two structures is enclosed in a  glass pyramid-shaped atrium. Deliberately designed as an optical illusion, Pennzoil Place's appearance will vary depending on the different locations from where it is viewed. Pennzoil Place is considered significant in architectural circles for breaking the modernist glass box design made popular by followers of Ludwig Mies van der Rohe and for introducing the era of postmodernism. The buildings combined contain  of leasable space.

The interior offices were designed by M. Arthur Gensler Jr. & Associates, the San Francisco-based interior architecture firm.

Architect Philip Johnson was awarded the 1978 AIA Gold Medal and became the first laureate of the Pritzker Prize in Architecture in 1979 for his work on Pennzoil Place. Pennzoil Place was named "Building of the Decade" in 1975 by The New York Times architecture critic Ada Louise Huxtable because of the dramatic silhouette it added to the Houston skyline.

See also

List of tallest buildings in Houston
Architecture of Houston
List of tallest buildings in Texas

References

External links

Pennzoil Place at Google's 3D Warehouse
Images of Pennzoil Place

Skyscraper office buildings in Houston
Office buildings completed in 1975
Twin towers
Shell plc buildings and structures
Philip Johnson buildings
Buildings and structures in Houston
John Burgee buildings
1975 establishments in Texas